WWTN (99.7 MHz) is a commercial FM radio station serving the Nashville, Tennessee media market.  The station is owned by Cumulus Media and is marketed as SuperTalk 99.7 WTN (the first W is eliminated for simplicity).  WWTN operates at 100,000 watts, the maximum for non-grandfathered FM stations and is a Class C0 station.

WWTN is licensed to the city of Hendersonville, Tennessee, which is approximately 15 miles (24 km) northeast of Nashville. Its antenna (395 meters/1296 feet in height above average terrain) is located approximately 25 miles (40 km) SSE of Nashville in Rutherford County, Tennessee, between the cities of Murfreesboro and Franklin.  The station's studios are in the Music Row district of Nashville.

History
On June 20, 1962, the station first signed on the air as WMSR-FM, licensed to the city of Manchester, Tennessee. It began focusing on the Nashville market in the early 1990s. Manchester is nearly halfway between Nashville and Chattanooga, but the Cumberland Plateau prevents a Manchester FM signal from penetrating Chattanooga, and vice versa. Its current signal range covers most of Middle Tennessee, even venturing into parts of Northern Alabama and Southern Kentucky. The city of license changed to Hendersonville in 2008, as part of a larger project that saw four of Cumulus' five Nashville stations change cities of license in the process of allowing sister station WNFN to move its transmitter and increase power.

The station was mired in mediocrity and bankruptcy in the early 1990s until being purchased by Gaylord Entertainment Company in 1995.  Gaylord also owned 650 WSM (AM) and 95.5 WSM-FM, as well as the Grand Ole Opry concert hall and Opryland USA amusement park.  During this period, WWTN broadcast a mixture of locally originated general interest talk programming, sports talk, and the Business Talk Radio Network.   Within three years subsequent to the Gaylord purchase, WWTN was Nashville's highest-billing radio station.  In 2003, WWTN and WSM-FM were sold to Cumulus Media for $65 million  .

Programming
The station features a local schedule of programming until the late afternoon drive. The weekday evening schedule comes from syndicated shows provided by the Westwood One Network, a subsidiary of Cumulus Media: The Mark Levin Show, Ben Shapiro and Red Eye Radio.

Weekends feature the common mix of special interest advice programs, including syndicated shows from Kim Komando, Ric Edelman and Bill Cunningham. Some weekend hours are paid brokered programming.  

In 1992, WWTN began airing a local show entitled The Money Game with Dave Ramsey, Hal Wilson, and Roy Matlock. Wilson and Matlock left the show at different points in its early history. With Ramsey hosting alone, his company assumed ownership of the program, which was renamed The Dave Ramsey Show in 1996 and was eventually independently syndicated to over 500 stations nationwide. WWTN served as the flagship until 2012, when Ramsey moved the show to 102.5 WPRT-FM in 2013, and then to WLAC 1510 AM in 2014.

WWTN served as the flagship station for the nationally syndicated weekday afternoon talk show hosted by Phil Valentine until July 2021, when his health deteriorated from COVID-19 and its after-effects. Valentine died on August 21, 2021.

Market competition
WWTN's primary talk competition is 1510 WLAC, an AM talk radio station owned by iHeartMedia, and non-commercial NPR member station 90.3 WPLN-FM owned by Nashville Public Radio.

See also
List of Nashville media

References

External links
Official site (link to streaming audio included within site)

WTN
News and talk radio stations in the United States
Radio stations established in 1962
1962 establishments in Tennessee
Companies that filed for Chapter 11 bankruptcy in 1995
Cumulus Media radio stations